Daughtridge is a surname. Notable people with the surname include:

Elijah L. Daughtridge (1863–1921), American politician
William G. Daughtridge Jr. (1952–2019), American businessman and politician